The 2001–02 North West Counties Football League season was the 20th in the history of the North West Counties Football League, a football competition in England. Teams were divided into two divisions: Division One and Division Two.

Division One 

Division One featured four new teams:

 Atherton Laburnum Rovers, promoted as third place in Division Two
 Congleton Town, relegated from the NPL Division One
 Winsford United, relegated from the NPL Division One
 Warrington Town, promoted as champions of Division Two

League table

Division Two 

Division Two featured four new teams:

 Cheadle Town, relegated from Division One
 Leek CSOB, relegated from Division One
 Norton United, promoted as champions of the Midland Football League
 Stand Athletic, promoted as champions of the Manchester League

League table

References

 http://www.tonykempster.co.uk/archive01-02/nwc.htm

External links 
 NWCFL Official Site

North West Counties Football League seasons
8